Chase Austin (born October 3, 1989) is an American professional racing driver. He is a former development driver with Hendrick Motorsports and Rusty Wallace Racing, racing in NASCAR's Nationwide and Camping World Truck Series. He also competed in the Firestone Indy Lights series from 2011 to 2014.

Background
Austin started racing when he was 7, in an old worn out go kart he built with his father.  He earned over 60 wins while racing karts in the late 1990s to early 2000s. In 2001, he raced in micro sprint cars and won 16 features in two years. Then he moved up to full size sprint cars, dirt track racing modifieds, and late models on dirt and asphalt. While competing in the Kansas area, he won over 100 features in karts, sprint cars and stock cars. He won the "Future Dirt Track World Championship", a dirt late model race for around a dozen of the United States' top teenaged drivers.

NASCAR career
In late 2004, at age 14, Austin signed a driver development deal with Hendrick Motorsports. Hendrick assigned him to race for the team's ally SS Racing in the ASA Late Model Series.

In 2009, he won two races with one top five, six top ten finishes and a pole position.

Hendrick dissolved its driver development program in 2006. Originally backed by the new STAR Motorsports team, the deal fell through after STAR failed to fulfill its financial obligations. Austin's family was given a race shop and car parts, so they used the parts to race in numerous series. While a 16-year-old in high school, Austin was the driver and crew chief for the family effort. He raced in 23 events in the season, with 3 wins, six top fives, and eight top tens. He competed on dirt and asphalt. He competed in his first USAR Hooters Procup Series race.

Austin made one start at the 2007 Sam's Town 250 at Memphis Motorsports Park for RWI, finishing 41st after crashing out. In that start, he became the first African American driver to start in a NASCAR Busch Series (then the name of the XFINITY Series) oval track race, and the second African American driver to start in the series' history. He started in eleven NASCAR Grand National Division, Busch East Series races, with four top ten finishes. He had his first start in ARCA that season. He was scheduled to run 15 races for RWI in the Nationwide Series in 2008, but those plans were postponed. He left the team later in the season. He was announced as the driver of the No. 32 Trail Motorsport Chevrolet Silverado in 2009, but the team closed very early in the season. Chase Austin picked up a ride with Xxxtreme Motorsport to drive the #07 Chevrolet part-time. During the Nationwide Series race at Bristol Motor Speedway on August 21, 2009, he crashed heavily with Kyle Busch and Reed Sorenson while dropping down the track following a punctured tire.

Austin ran a Camping World Truck and Nationwide race in 2010 for the newly formed United Racing Group with sponsorship from Walgreens and Forgotten Harvest.

Indy Lights and IndyCar
When unable to find a ride in NASCAR in 2011, Austin signed on with African American former IndyCar driver Willy T. Ribbs in association with Brooks Associates Racing to make his Firestone Indy Lights debut in the Firestone Freedom 100 at the Indianapolis Motor Speedway. Austin also competed in the Freedom 100 in 2012.

In August 2012, it was announced that Austin would drive for A. J. Foyt Enterprises in the 2013 Indianapolis 500. However, the second Foyt Indy 500 entry was ultimately driven by Conor Daly.

Personal life
Austin is the son of an African American father and a Caucasian mother.  He lives in Eudora, Kansas.

Racing record

American open–wheel racing results
(key)

Indy Lights

NASCAR
(key) (Bold – Pole position awarded by qualifying time. Italics – Pole position earned by points standings or practice time. * – Most laps led.)

Nationwide Series

Camping World Truck Series

Busch East Series

ARCA Re/Max Series
(key) (Bold – Pole position awarded by qualifying time. Italics – Pole position earned by points standings or practice time. * – Most laps led.)

References

External links
 
 

Living people
1989 births
People from Eudora, Kansas
Racing drivers from Kansas
Indy Lights drivers
NASCAR drivers
African-American racing drivers
ARCA Menards Series drivers
21st-century African-American sportspeople
20th-century African-American people
Belardi Auto Racing drivers
Bryan Herta Autosport drivers
Juncos Hollinger Racing drivers